The Pic du Thabor is a mountain of Savoie and Hautes-Alpes, France. It lies in the Massif des Cerces range. It has an elevation of 3,207 metres above sea level, it stands closed to another summit, the Mont Thabor, culminating at 3,178 metres above sea level.

References

Mountains of the Alps
Alpine three-thousanders
Mountains of Savoie
Mountains of Hautes-Alpes